1428: Shadows Over Silesia is a Dark fantasy Action-adventure game developed by KUBI Games set during Hussite Wars. It is the first Czech video game that is fully blind accessible.

Development
1428: Shadows over Silesia was announced on 18 February 2020 after the project left pre-production phase. Due to lack of finances developers launched crowdfunding campaign through HitHit platform on 7 September 2021 asking for 500,000 CZK. Crowdfunding campaign successfully concluded on 7 October 2021. It had gathered 606,670 CZK. On 7 February 2022 demo was released while release date was set for late Summer 2022.

Developers announced on 21 March 2022 that the game will be fully blind accessible. Kubi Games worked with blind programmer Lukáš Hosnedl during development. The game features navigational sonar and recitation of written texts to allow blind players playing the game.

Release date was later set for 6 September 2022 but later delayed for 4 October 2022. The game was released on 4 October on Steam. Xzone released physical copy of the game.

Plot
The game is set during 1428 Hussite campaign in Silesia. Story is told through eyes of rude Hussite Hauptmann Hynek and Knight Hospitaller Lothar whose fates get intertwined. Question is if they remain enemies or join forces to face a bigger threat.

Gameplay
1428: Shadows over Silesia storyline progresses through 13 chapters during which player takes role of hussite Hynek and Knight Lothar. Storyline is linear with emphasis on story. Gameplay combines various genres including Adventure, Stealth game and Action game with swordplays. Fights are tactical with emphasis on realism. Player has to defend himself during fights and time his strikes well to win. If player is outnumbered he has to use advantageous position. Player has to often use stealth instead of facing enemies directly. Some parts focus on adventure aspect of the game with player gathering various objects for use to advance further (such as keys) and solving logical puzzles. Player also finds various texts on his way that expand lore of the game. Some texts are written in cipher which player has to solve in a logical Minigame. Another Minigame are Dices

References

External links
 

Dark fantasy video games
Action-adventure games
2022 video games
Video games developed in the Czech Republic
Video games set in the 15th century
Hussite Wars in popular culture
Video games set in Poland
Windows games
Windows-only games